Boophis periegetes is a species of frogs in the family Mantellidae.

It is endemic to Madagascar, officially known only from Ranomafana National Park with unconfirmed records in Andohahela National Park, Andringitra National Park and Kalambatritra Reserve.
Its natural habitats are subtropical or tropical moist lowland forests, subtropical or tropical moist montane forests, and rivers.
It is threatened by habitat loss for agriculture, timber extraction, charcoal manufacturing, invasive eucalyptus, livestock grazing and expanding human settlement.

Sources

periegetes
Amphibians described in 1995
Endemic frogs of Madagascar
Taxonomy articles created by Polbot